Joanna Pettet (born Joanna Jane Salmon; 16 November 1942) is a retired English actress.

Early life
Pettet was born in Westminster, London, England.

Her parents, Harold Nigel Edgerton Salmon, a British Royal Air Force pilot killed in the Second World War, and Cecily J. Tremaine, were married in Chelsea, London in 1940. After the war, her mother remarried and settled in Montréal, where young Joanna was adopted by her stepfather and assumed his surname of "Pettet".

When Pettet was 16, she moved to New York City.

Career

Pettet studied with Sanford Meisner at the Neighborhood Playhouse School of the Theatre, as well as at the Lincoln Center, and got her start on Broadway in such plays as Take Her, She's Mine, The Chinese Prime Minister, and Poor Richard, with Alan Bates and Gene Hackman.  Beginning in 1964 with an episode of Route 66, she began making guest appearances in several US dramatic television series of the mid-sixties, including The Doctors, The Nurses, The Trials of O'Brien, The Fugitive, A Man Called Shenandoah, and Dr. Kildare.

In 1966 she was cast in writer/producer Sidney Buchman's 1966 adaptation of Mary McCarthy's novel The Group. The success of that film launched a film career that included roles in The Night of the Generals (1967), as Mata Bond in the James Bond spoof Casino Royale (1967), Peter Yates's Robbery (1967) with Stanley Baker, Blue (1968) with Terence Stamp, and the Victorian period comedy The Best House in London (1969).

In the 1970s her feature film appearances became sporadic and included roles in the cult horror films Welcome to Arrow Beach (1974) and The Evil (1978). Pettet re-emerged as the star of over a dozen made-for-television movies, including The Weekend Nun (1972), Footsteps (1972), Pioneer Woman (1973), A Cry in the Wilderness (1974), The Desperate Miles (1975), The Hancocks (1976), Sex and the Married Woman (1977), Cry of the Innocent (1980) with Rod Taylor, and The Return of Frank Cannon (1980).

She guest-starred four times on the classic Rod Serling anthology series Night Gallery, appearance alongside her then-husband Alex Cord in the episode  "Keep in Touch - We'll Think of Something". She starred in the NBC miniseries Captains and the Kings (1976), starred in the episode "You're Not Alone" from the 1977 NBC anthology series Quinn Martin's Tales of the Unexpected (known in the United Kingdom as Twist in the Tale), was a guest on both Fantasy Island and The Love Boat (appearing three times on each series), and had a recurring role on Knots Landing in 1983 as Janet Baines, an LAPD homicide detective investigating the murder of singer Ciji Dunne (played by Lisa Hartman).

Through the 1970s and 80s, Pettet also made appearances on the television series Banacek, McCloud, Mannix, Police Woman, Knight Rider, Tales of the Unexpected (the UK series) and Murder, She Wrote. In 1984, she appeared as herself in a James Bond tribute episode of The Fall Guy alongside ex-Bond girls Britt Ekland and Lana Wood.

Her final role was in the 1990 thriller Terror in Paradise, after which she retired from acting, still in her forties.

Personal life
On 8 August 1969, Pettet had lunch at the home of actress Sharon Tate, hours before the crimes were committed at that residence by members of the Manson Family. This event is illustrated in the 2019 film Once Upon a Time...In Hollywood, in which Pettet is portrayed by Rumer Willis.

In 2003, actor Alan Bates bequeathed Pettet £95,000 upon his death.  The two had been friends for many years and Pettet provided support and companionship during his final months after he had been diagnosed with pancreatic cancer in 2002. Pettet was quoted as saying: "It was a very touching gesture because he had done everything while he was in hospital to make sure I would be looked after following his death."

Recognition
Pettet won a Theatre World Award for 1964–1965 for her work in Poor Richard.

Filmography

Film

Television

Awards and nominations

References

External links
 
 
 

1942 births
20th-century English actresses
Actresses from London
British people taken hostage
English film actresses
English television actresses
Foreign hostages in the Philippines
Formerly missing people
Living people
Missing person cases in the Philippines
Neighborhood Playhouse School of the Theatre alumni